Joculator introspectus is a species of minute sea snails, marine gastropod molluscs in the family Cerithiopsidae. It was described by Cotton in 1951.

References

Gastropods described in 1951
introspectus